Bruce Featherston (born 10 July 1952) is an Australian former swimmer. He competed in five events at the 1972 Summer Olympics.

References

External links
 

1952 births
Living people
Australian male backstroke swimmers
Australian male freestyle swimmers
Australian male medley swimmers
Olympic swimmers of Australia
Swimmers at the 1972 Summer Olympics
Place of birth missing (living people)
20th-century Australian people